, also known as Miracle of the Pacific, Battle of the Pacific and Codename: Fox, is a 2011 Japanese World War II Pacific War drama film directed by Hideyuki Hirayama and based on the true story of Captain Sakae Ōba, who together with his survivors held out on the island of Saipan for 512 days.

Plot
During the Battle of Saipan, on 7 July 1944, Captain Sakae Ōba partakes in a final banzai charge against the United States Marine Corps on the island of Saipan. It is the largest banzai charge of the Pacific War, but fails, resulting in over 4,000 Japanese deaths after 15 hours of close combat. American forces declare the island secure on 9 July, while Ōba and a handful of survivors retreat into the jungle and begin a guerrilla-style war using Mount Tapochau as a base due to its natural defensive position and prominent heights overlooking every possible approach.

With only 46 soldiers/sailors and 200 civilians at his disposal, Ōba (nicknamed "the Fox" by the Americans due to his cunning strategy) holds out for 512 days before surrendering on 1 December 1945, having lasted three months after Japan's capitulation following the bombing of Hiroshima and Nagasaki. Ōba marches down from the mountain with his remaining survivors singing “Spirit of Infantry” (an Imperial Japanese army infantry song) and presents his sword to the American commander in a formal and dignified manner, the last organized resistance of Japanese forces of the Second World War.

Cast
 Yutaka Takenouchi as Captain Sakae Ōba ("the Fox")
 Sean McGowan as Captain Lewis
 Ken Mitsuishi as Second Lieutenant Nagata (Military Police)
 Itsuji Itao as Ensign Kinbara (Navy Land Forces)
 Mao Inoue as Chieko Aono
 Takayuki Yamada as Sergeant Major Toshio Kitani
 Tomoko Nakajima as Haruko Okuno
 Yoshinori Okada as Sergeant Saburo Bito
 Sadao Abe as Suekichi Motoki
 Daniel Baldwin as Colonel Pollard
 Treat Williams as Colonel Wessinger
 Toshiaki Karasawa as Private Kesamatsu Horiuchi ("Saipan Tiger")

References

External links
 
 

2011 films
2011 drama films
2011 war drama films
Japanese war drama films
2010s Japanese-language films
Films directed by Hideyuki Hirayama
Films set in the Northern Mariana Islands
Films shot in the Northern Mariana Islands
Pacific War films
Japanese World War II films
2010s Japanese films